Lethe nicetella, the  small woodbrown, is a species of Satyrinae butterfly found in the  Indomalayan realm  (Tibet, Sikkim).

References

nicetella
Butterflies of Asia